Cre'Von Lashaad "Strap" LeBlanc (born July 25, 1994) is an American football cornerback for the Arlington Renegades of the XFL. He played college football at Florida Atlantic.

Professional career

New England Patriots
After going undrafted in the 2016 NFL Draft, he was signed by the Patriots as a rookie free agent. LeBlanc made a one-handed interception in the endzone in a preseason game against the New Orleans Saints. The interception was named the top play of the 2016 preseason. On September 3, 2016, he was released by the Patriots as part of their final roster cuts with a designation to be added to injury reserve.

Chicago Bears
On September 4, 2016, LeBlanc was claimed off waivers by the Chicago Bears. On December 11, 2016, LeBlanc recorded his first career interception against the Detroit Lions, picking off Matthew Stafford and returning it for a touchdown.

On September 1, 2018, LeBlanc was waived by the Bears.

Detroit Lions
On September 3, 2018, LeBlanc was signed to the Detroit Lions' practice squad. He was promoted to the active roster on October 6, 2018. He was waived on November 3, 2018.

Philadelphia Eagles
On November 5, 2018, LeBlanc was claimed off waivers by the Philadelphia Eagles. LeBlanc was forced into action in Week 11 during a 48-7 loss to the New Orleans Saints following  a litany of injuries in the Eagles' secondary. In an interview with the media following a 16-15 win against the Chicago Bears in the playoffs, LeBlanc was praised by defensive coordinator Jim Schwartz, saying, "I don’t know where we’d be without Cre’Von ... that might have been the key to our season, putting the waiver claim in." In a 20-14 loss to the Saints, LeBlanc recorded an interception against Drew Brees on the very first play of the game. LeBlanc recorded 7 tackles, 3 pass deflections, and an interception over 2 postseason games, and was given the highest grade of any cornerback in the postseason by Pro Football Focus.

LeBlanc signed a one-year extension with the team on September 2, 2019, and subsequently placed on injured reserve with a foot injury suffered during training camp. He was designated for return from injured reserve on November 26, 2019, and began practicing with the team again. He was activated on November 30, 2019. LeBlanc was given his first start of the season in a Week 17 matchup against the New York Giants, where he responded with a career high eight total tackles, including a tackle on Saquon Barkley on a 4th down and short, as well as two pass deflections. LeBlanc started the Eagles' Wild Card game against the Seattle Seahawks, where he recorded four tackles and two pass deflections in the 17-9 loss.

The Eagles released LeBlanc on September 6, 2020, but re-signed with the team the next day. He was placed on injured reserve on November 24, 2020 with an ankle injury.

Miami Dolphins
On July 23, 2021, LeBlanc signed with the Miami Dolphins. He was released on August 31, 2021.

Houston Texans
On September 7, 2021, LeBlanc signed with the Houston Texans. He was promoted to the active roster on October 29, 2021. He was waived on December 4 and re-signed to the practice squad.

New England Patriots (second stint)
On January 12, 2022, LeBlanc was signed to the New England Patriots practice squad.

Las Vegas Raiders
On February 17, 2022, LeBlanc signed a reserve/future contract with the Las Vegas Raiders. He was placed on injured reserve on August 12, 2022. He was released on August 23.

Personal life
When LeBlanc was a sophomore in high school, his father died of a heart attack at the age of 44. LeBlanc released a rap single on April 16, 2021.

References

External links
Philadelphia Eagles bio
New England Patriots bio
Florida Atlantic Owls bio

1994 births
Living people
American football cornerbacks
Chicago Bears players
Detroit Lions players
Florida Atlantic Owls football players
Houston Texans players
Las Vegas Raiders players
Miami Dolphins players
New England Patriots players
People from Belle Glade, Florida
Philadelphia Eagles players
Players of American football from Florida
Sportspeople from the Miami metropolitan area